Latvian cuisine typically consists of agricultural products, with meat featuring in most main meal dishes. Fish is commonly consumed due to Latvia's location on the eastern shore of the Baltic Sea.

Latvian cuisine has been influenced by other countries of the Baltic rim. Common ingredients in Latvian recipes are found locally, such as potatoes, wheat, barley, cabbage, onions, eggs and pork. Due to pronounced four seasons, the Latvian cuisine is markedly seasonal and each time of the year has its own distinctive products and dishes. Latvian food is generally quite fatty and uses few spices.

Meals
Contemporary Latvians usually eat three meals a day. Breakfast is normally light and usually consists of sandwiches or an omelette, with a drink, often milk. Lunch is eaten from noon to 3 p.m. and tends to be the main meal of the day; as such it can include a variety of foods, and sometimes also soup as an entrée and a dessert. Supper is the last meal of the day, with some choosing to eat another large meal. Consumption of ready-made or frozen meals is now common.

Common foods and dishes

Latvian cuisine is typical of the Baltic region and, in general, of northern countries. The food is high in butter and fat while staying low in spices except for black pepper, dill or grains/seeds, such as caraway seeds. Latvian cuisine originated from the peasant culture and is strongly based on crops that grow in Latvia's maritime, temperate climate. Rye or wheat, oats, peas, beets, cabbage, pork products, and potatoes are the staples. Latvian cuisine offers plenty of varieties of bread and dairy products, which are an important part of the cuisine. Meat features in most main meal dishes, but fish also is commonly consumed, especially in the coastal areas next to Baltic Sea. Both are also smoked.

A lot of common dishes in contemporary Latvia come directly from other countries, often as a result of their historical domination. Popular dishes adopted from Soviet cuisine include pelmeni (pelmeņi) with sour cream, borsch (borščs), stroganoff (stroganovs), dressed herring (siļķe kažokā), shashlik (šašliks), rasol (rasols). plov (plovs), kefir (kefīrs), kvass and solyanka (soļanka).

The most consumed alcoholic beverage is beer. A national liquor is Riga Black Balsam.

Dairy products 

Latvia is much richer in dairy products than other Western countries. Cottage cheese (biezpiens), sour cream (skābais krējums), soured milk (rūgušpiens) and a different types of fresh and dried cheeses are available. Kefir, soured milk and other fermented milk beverages are usually consumed with hot dishes.

Cottage cheese is frequently mixed with sour cream and eaten for breakfast, as well as added to salads and used in cakes and other desserts like the curd snack (biezpiena sieriņš). In 2012, the curd snack Kārums was voted the favorite product of Latvian consumers, receiving 20% of the votes.  For lunch, the cottage cheese is traditionally usually eaten with boiled potatoes, lightly salted herring, spring onions and sour cream.

Since the early 20th century a distinct type of butter is made in Rucava – the Rucava white butter (Rucavas baltais sviests) that in 2018 received the Protected Designation of Origin classification in European Union. Butter can also be mixed with roasted and ground hemp seeds and salt to make hemp butter (kaņepju sviests) that is usually eaten with rye bread.

Seeds, nuts, dried fruits, clover or mixtures of dried herbs are often added to the cheese. It also frequently smoked or aged in oil, but fresh cheese is served with garlic or herbs. Traditional Latvian cheese is the Jāņi cheese made and served during the summer festival Jāņi and considered a symbol of Latvian culture.

Soups 

Soups are commonly made with vegetables and broth or milk. Cold borscht (aukstā zupa), fish soup (zivju zupa), sorrel soup (skābeņu zupa) and mushroom soup (sēņu zupa) are also consumed by Latvians. A traditional Latvian dessert is rye bread soup (maizes zupa) made from rye bread, whipped cream, dried fruit and cranberries.

Cold borscht is usually prepared in the spring and consists of kefir or soured milk, boiled beets, chopped radish, fresh cucumbers, boiled eggs and different greens.

Bread 

Rye bread (rudzu maize) has been a national food staple for centuries and is included in the Latvian Culture Canon. The bread is similar to a Russian or German black bread and is made from coarse rye flour, malt and caraway seeds and traditionally baked in a wood-fired oven. Another popular type of bread is sweet and sour bread (saldskābmaize) made from finely ground rye flour and caraway seeds. Fried rye bread with garlic (ķiploku grauzdiņi) and mayonnaise is often served as a starter in restaurants and bars. White bread (baltmaize) was considered a delicacy and was only eaten on festive occasions.

Pastries 

A popular pastry is the speķa pīrāgi, wheat or rye flour buns filled with finely cut streaky bacon and onions. Sometimes caraway seeds are also added to the dough. Speķa pīrāgi are common Ziemassvētki and Jāņi pastry. Kliņģeris is a sweet pretzel-shaped bread that is usually served as a dessert on special occasions, such as name day. Sklandrausis is a traditional dish in Latvian cuisine which has a Livonian origin; it's a sweet pie, made of rye dough and filled with potato and carrot paste and seasoned with caraway. In 2013, sklandrausis received a "Traditional Speciality Guaranteed" designation from the European Commission.

Drinks 

Ancient Latvians brewed beer (alus), mead (miestiņš) and honey beer (medalus) before the 13th century for both celebratory occasions and everyday use. After the Baltic Crusades, the local beer brewing was influenced by the incoming Western European techniques. For example, prior to that many different herbs were used, but they were replaced by hops as a preservative and flavoring agent. A craft brewery drawing upon the ancient brewing traditions is  that uses a wide variety of herbs, flowers, berries and spices in their brews.

A very popular drink in spring is fresh birch sap. Traditionally, it was preserved by adding raisins, lemon rind, and blackcurrant twigs. For a long time, birch sap was sold in plastic bottles in markets and roadside stalls until Linards Liberts revamped its image and started started producing bottled birch sap, birch sap lemonade, birch sap still and sparkling wine, birch sap mulled wine and birch sap schnapps.

Kvass, traditionally brewed from fermented rye or black bread, has also remained popular in Latvia. In the Latvian SSR, kvass was sold by street vendors from carts with big yellow canisters, while nowadays mass-produced kvass can be bought at supermarkets.

With the development of cold-hardy grape varieties more suitable for the northern climate, winemaking has become more common in Latvia. In addition to that, raspberry, black currant, and other fruit wines are also being made, as well as ciders. Wine Hill of Sabile used to be registered in the Guinness Book of Records as the most northern open-air vineyard in the world. Since 1999 the town also hosts an annual wine festival.

Mushrooms 
Latvia has ancient traditions involving edible mushrooms. Picking wild mushrooms is very popular in autumn. Modern, as well as traditional mushroom preparation, is very popular. There are around 4,100 mushroom species in Latvia, 1,100 of those are cup mushrooms. About ¼ of these are edible. The most popular edible ones are various Boletus and Cantharellus. From mushrooms, onions, garlic, sweet or sour cream and sometimes bacon a mushroom sauce is made and usually eaten with boiled potatoes and slightly salted cucumbers.

Gallery

See also

 Latvian pottery

References

External links

 Latvian Eats